Manuel Araullo y Gonzales (1 January 1853 – 26 July 1924) was the third Chief Justice of the Supreme Court of the Philippines. He served from November 1, 1921 until his death on July 26, 1924.

Araullo earned his Bachelor of Laws from the University of Santo Tomas, where he became a professor.

References

Further reading
 Cruz, Isagani A. (2000). Res Gestae: A Brief History of the Supreme Court. Rex Book Store, Manila

1853 births
1924 deaths
Manuel Araullo
University of Santo Tomas alumni
Academic staff of the University of Santo Tomas
19th-century Filipino lawyers
Associate Justices of the Supreme Court of the Philippines
20th-century Filipino judges